Peter Ho is a retired Singaporean senior civil servant. Ho was the chairman of the Urban Redevelopment Authority, Social Science Research Council, Singapore Centre for Environmental Life Sciences Engineering and National Supercomputing Centre. Ho is also a member of the council of the International Institute for Strategic Studies and a senior advisor to the Centre for Strategic Futures.

See also
Statutory boards of the Singapore Government
Singapore civil service

References

Permanent secretaries of Singapore
Living people
Year of birth missing (living people)